South Delta Space Age is an album by the band Third Rail, featuring guitarist James Blood Ulmer, bassist Bill Laswell, drummer Joseph "Zigaboo" Modeliste, and organists Amina Claudine Myers and Bernie Worrell. It was recorded in 1995 and released on the Antilles label.

Reception

Allmusic gave the album 4 stars, and the review by Stewart Mason stated, "The first album by the James Blood Ulmer and Bill Laswell collaboration Third Rail is a sometimes confusing mishmash of styles; however, given the title, it appears that the juxtaposition of dirty blues-based grooves and spacey psychedelic jazz-funk is entirely intentional. Whether or not the combination is entirely satisfying is up to the listener, but while the album occasionally seems to have more ideas than it knows what to do with, most of them do work".

Track listing
All compositions by James Blood Ulmer except where noted
 "Dusted" (James Blood Ulmer, Jesse Bonds Weaver, Jr., Bill Laswell) – 7:07
 "Grounded" (Ulmer, Joseph Modeliste, Laswell) – 4:26
 "Funk All Night" – 4:51
 "In The Name Of" – 5:17
 "Please Tell Her" – 3:55
 "Itchin'" – 4:48
 "Blues March" (Ulmer, Modeliste) – 7:45
 "First Blood" – 5:22
 "Lord Thank You" – 8:03

Personnel
James "Blood" Ulmer – guitar, vocals
Bill Laswell − bass
Joseph "Zigaboo" Modeliste – drums, percussion
Bernie Worrell − Hammond B-3 organ, clavinet
Amina Claudine Myers − Hammond B-3 organ, electric piano, voice

References

1995 albums
Antilles Records albums
James Blood Ulmer albums
Bill Laswell albums
Ziggy Modeliste albums
Amina Claudine Myers albums
Bernie Worrell albums
albums produced by Bill Laswell